Craig Kevin Busch (born 18 December 1964), nicknamed The Lion Man, is a former New Zealand television personality. He was the founder and majority shareholder of Zion Wildlife Gardens Ltd, which featured on television programme The Lion Man. Zion Wildlife Gardens is now named Kamo Wildlife Sanctuary.

Background
Busch has claimed that while spending time in Utah, in a mountainous region populated with wild cougars, he developed a friendship with one of these cougars and realised that interacting with big cats was his mission in life.. Later he spent time in Hollywood as an animal handler for studios and wealthy individuals.

On his return to New Zealand in 1996, Busch built Zion Wildlife Gardens, initially in Kerikeri where he leased a property from the Cornelius family, and then relocated it to the current site, north of Whangarei.

In 2002 Busch purchased five white tigers from Bonnie Ringo of Cave Junction, Oregon in the United States.

Zion Wildlife Gardens
Busch said he aimed to breed big cats to increase their numbers.

In 2005, Busch arranged the exchange of New Zealand's first natively born white tigers, Tane and Aotea (born January 2005), and later Kiwi and Rongo (born 2 October 2005), with a white lion cub named Gandor from the Rhino and Lion Nature Reserve near Johannesburg.

Busch featured in the reality series The Lion Man, which became one of New Zealand's biggest selling television series internationally. The series was shown in more than 130 different countries.

In January 2006, Auckland builder Robert Reece alleged Busch owed him NZ$400,000. Reece had planned to take court action to recover the debt during the following month. Reece claimed he had financed the majority of the zoo facilities at Zion Wildlife Gardens. He also had claimed he had paid NZ$80,000 for Busch to go to the US and obtain five white tigers for the park. Reece had been involved with Busch since around 2000.

In 2007, Busch was convicted in the Whangarei District Court of assaulting his former partner Karen Greybrook in 2005. Greybrook sustained a cut to her head, a fractured vertebra and bruising. Greybrook died from unrelated complications during September 2011 in Australia, where she had resided for some years after the assault.

In November 2008, Busch was dismissed from Zion Wildlife Park. In the years that followed, Busch and his mother Patricia battled in court over ownership of the park and its assets.

At the end of May 2009, serious allegations were made against Busch by Zion Wildlife Gardens park staff. The allegations included the inhumane killing of unwanted cubs with rocks, beating of two lions with a short stick, and putting the lives of staff at risk by having them run with tigers. It was alleged that one of the staff members had been jumped upon by one of the tigers, and the animal had gone for the keeper's throat. The tiger had been forced off by another staff member. Busch denied the allegations.

In June 2011, the Northern Advocate reported Busch had been taken to court by Whangarei-based lawyer Wayne Peters for unpaid legal fees amounting to a total of $86,351.47, relating to various legal services provided for a period of seven months during 2009. Peters had applied for summary judgement, after attempts to serve Busch with court documents in 2010 had failed. The presiding judge had declined summary judgement, due to Busch being overseas.

In August 2011, Busch attempted to have his mother Patricia Busch adjudicated bankrupt over an alleged debt of $3800. Associate Judge Bell declined to hear the case on the day, and set a later hearing date set for October that year. In October, Busch then withdrew the bankruptcy proceedings, after Associate Judge Bell ordered Busch to pay $3800 as security costs for a hearing to proceed.

During mid-January 2012, the Northern Advocate reported a defamation suit was being taken against Busch and his spokeswoman Jill Albrow for statements and actions taken relating to a video uploaded on YouTube in August 2010.

On 31 January 2012, Zion Wildlife Gardens was sold by receivers PricewaterhouseCoopers to Zion Wildlife Kingdom Limited. Busch also returned as a self-employed contractor, fulfilling a specialist animal handler role at the facility.

In February 2012, current affairs programme Campbell Live revealed Busch had not reported injuries to a young boy by a lion cub, during his tenure as operator of Zion Wildlife Gardens. Former park workers also alleged that Busch had lost a finger after it had been bitten off by the white lion Gandor. Footage included in the programme also showed Busch pulling a lion on a chain, and of one animal being subjected to physical punishment.

In April 2012, the park reopened under the name Kingdom of Zion. In the same month, the New Zealand-based current affairs programme Campbell Live aired an item concerning serious allegations made against Busch by Ed Hern of the Rhino & Lion Nature Reserve, and Fred Berrange of the Leopard Conservation Project, both based in South Africa, of unpaid loans and stolen film footage. In the same news item, questions were also raised about Busch's dealings with the finances of the defunct UK charity Big Cat Rescue Trust (UK).

In August 2013, Busch's former lawyer Wayne Peters again took action against his former client for unpaid legal fees. Presiding judge John McDonald ruled that Busch was required to pay the sum of $86,351.47 for the legal work carried out, as well as interest and costs.

Declawing at the Park
From 2000 to 2008, during Busch's tenure as Zoo Operator, 30 (21 lions and 9 tigers) of the big cats were declawed, a "restricted" surgical procedure in New Zealand. No legal action was taken against Mr Busch.

ERA (Employment Relations Authority)
On 3 November 2008 Busch was dismissed from his role as Operator of Zion Wildlife Gardens by the companies. There were allegations by his employers Zion Wildlife Gardens Limited that he failed to keep proper training records, could not follow correct cash handling procedures, had caused a loss of revenue due to sudden and unexplained cancellation of tours, undertook major breaches of safety protocols and inappropriate behaviour in the workplace. In early December 2008 Busch applied for an interim reinstatement to the Employment Relations Authority (ERA). The ERA declined his application in its determination of 9 December 2008.

In August 2009 Busch then withdrew his claims to be reinstated and his personal grievance for unjustified dismissal.

"The Lion Man: African Safari"
From 2014 to 2015 Busch became star of a new reality TV series, The Lion Man: African Safari, on the Discovery Channel's Animal Planet network.

Jabula Big Cat Sanctuary 
Busch has a new park near Rustenburg in South Africa - the "Jabula Big Cat Sanctuary".

References

External links
  is a dead link
 

1964 births
Living people
New Zealand people of German descent
New Zealand television personalities
People educated at Saint Kentigern College
New Zealand expatriates in the United States